Willi Schrade (born 31 January 1935) is a German actor. He appeared in more than one hundred films since 1957.

Selected filmography

References

External links 

1935 births
Living people
Actors from Königsberg
People from East Prussia
German male film actors